Éxitos 98:06, released on November 21, 2006, is a compilation album by Luis Fonsi featuring songs from his first six albums, spanning the time period from 1998 to 2006, with the addition of two songs, "Tu amor" and "No lo Digas Más". A deluxe edition was released on February 6, 2007.

Track listing

Source:

Singles

Tu Amor

Charts

References

Luis Fonsi compilation albums
2006 greatest hits albums
Universal Music Latino compilation albums
Spanish-language compilation albums